Charles Leon Ruffin (February 11, 1912 – August 14, 1970) was an American catcher in Negro league baseball. He played for the Brooklyn Eagles, Newark Eagles, Pittsburgh Crawfords, and Philadelphia Stars between 1935 and 1946.

A native of Portsmouth, Virginia, Ruffin served in the US Navy during World War II. He died in Portsmouth in 1970 at age 58.

References

External links
 and Baseball-Reference Black Baseball and Mexican League stats and Seamheads

1912 births
1970 deaths
Baseball players from Virginia
Brooklyn Eagles players
Newark Eagles players
Pittsburgh Crawfords players
Philadelphia Stars players
Sportspeople from Portsmouth, Virginia
United States Navy personnel of World War II
20th-century African-American sportspeople